Seppo Kuusela (25 February 1934 – 16 October 2014) was a Finnish basketball player, basketball coach, and handball player. At 182 cm tall, he played at the point guard and shooting guard positions, as a basketball player. He was twice voted the Finnish Basketball Player of the Year, in 1959 and 1960, by Finnish sports journalists.

Club basketball career
Kuusela played in the top-tier level Finnish basketball league, the SM-sarja, winning multiple Finnish League championships during his club career.

National basketball team career
Alongside club competitions, Kuusela also represented the senior Finnish national basketball team, at five EuroBasket tournaments (1955, 1957, 1959, 1961, and 1963).

Trophies and awards

Basketball player

 9× Finnish League Champion: (1952, 1953, 1954, 1955, 1956, 1957, 1959, 1968, 1969)
 Finnish League Runner-up: (1967)
 Finnish League 3rd Place: (1973)
 2× Finnish Player of the Year: (1959, 1960)
 2× Finnish League Top Scorer: (1960, 1961)
 Finnish Cup Winner: (1968)

Handball player
 2× Finnish Handball Championship Champion: (1953, 1955)

Basketball coach
 3× Finnish League Champion: (1970, 1971, 1972)

Other 
 Finnish Basketball Hall of Fame inductee 2019

Sources
Seppo Kuusela Finnish Basketball Association
National Team Stats Finnish Basketball Association

References

1934 births
2014 deaths
Finnish men's basketball players
Point guards
Shooting guards
Sportspeople from Helsinki
Finnish basketball coaches
Finnish male handball players